Jean-Amadée Gibert (January 28, 1869, Marseille – 1945, Marseille), was a French painter, architect and curator.

Biography 
He was a pupil of Antoine Dominique Magaud. In 1890, he won a painting prize in Marseille which allowed him to study in Paris at the École nationale supérieure des Beaux-Arts where he was a student of Gérôme and Jourdan. In 1898 he won the Grand Prix of Rome History of painting with The Pool of Bethesda which included a scholarship for study in Italy, where he discovered archaeology and architecture.

Gibert regularly exhibited portraits, genre scenes, still lifes and landscapes at the Paris Salon and in Marseille. In 1909 he became curator of Musée des Baux-Arts de Marseille, as well as the Grobet-Labadie and the Cantini in the same city. In 1919, he gave several works to museums, including a collection of figurines from Provence.

Gallery

References

19th-century French painters
French male painters
20th-century French painters
20th-century French male artists
Artists from Marseille
1869 births
1945 deaths
Architects from Marseille
Prix de Rome for painting
Directors of museums in France
French curators
French portrait painters
French landscape painters
19th-century French male artists